The saturnine antshrike (Thamnomanes saturninus) is a species of bird in the family Thamnophilidae. It is found in Bolivia, Brazil, and Peru. Its natural habitat is subtropical or tropical moist lowland forests.

The  saturnine antshrike was described by the Austrian ornithologist August von Pelzeln in 1868 and given the binomial name Thamnophilus saturninus.

References

saturnine antshrike
Birds of the Peruvian Amazon
saturnine antshrike
Taxonomy articles created by Polbot